The 2008 Limerick Senior Hurling Championship was the 114th staging of the Limerick Senior Hurling Championship since its establishment by the Limerick County Board in 1887.

Adare were the defending champions.

On 19 October 2008, Adare won the championship after a 0-13 to 0-08 defeat of Ahane in the final. It was their fourth championship title overall and their second title in succession.

References

External links

 2008 Limerick SHC results

Limerick Senior Hurling Championship
Limerick Senior Hurling Championship